Giuseppe ("Joseph") Lechi (5 December 1766 – 9 August 1836) was an Italian general in the Kingdom of Italy during the Napoleonic Wars.

Biography

Born in Aspes and being the first son of Faustino Lechi and his wife Doralice Bielli, the general Giuseppe Lechi was already considered a man of great light and shadows ("dark and gloomy"), reckless and unscrupulous similar to his uncle the Count Galliano Lechi, who was very dear, and a model, to Giuseppe. His grandfather Pietro was a famous Freemason and a follower of the Enlightenment.

Born a subject of the Most Serene Republic of Venice, he undertook the military career in the Austrian army up to the rank of captain. On the arrival of Napoleon in Italy, influenced also by his brother Giacomo, Giuseppe organized with his other brothers Teodoro and Angelo and other friends – all of them members of the "Casino dei Buoni Amici" free-masonnic secret society – the Bresciana revolution of 18 March 1797.

Giuseppe entered the temporary government of Brescia and organized the Brescian Legion that General Bonaparte sent to fighting in Emilia, Marche and then in Central Italy.

It was in Città di Castello, in 1798, that happened the famous episode of the discussed donation of Raphael's painting "The Marriage of the Virgin" to Giuseppe Lechi by the City Council.

In the spring of 1799 Giuseppe Lechi with his unit was engaged in a military campaign in Valtellina attempting to curb an anti-French revolt. Forced to retreat by the Austro-Russians, he joined the Italian Legion of General Pietro Teulié in Dijon.

Back in Italy with Napoleon he fought at Marengo (14 June 1800) where he was promoted to the rank of division general on the field itself.

After the Peace of Lunéville (9 February 1801) he became commander of division under Joachim Murat and one of his friends, followers and advisors. In the same time, Giuseppe entered the new legislative body of the Italian Republic.

More and more bound up with the "Murat's circle", General Lechi joined the Masonry of the Scottish Rite (becoming in the follow the Great Master of the Grand Lodge of Naples) and those groups of patriots who supported the ideal of the Italian unification.

In 1804, Giuseppe Lechi participated in the conquest of the Kingdom of Naples fighting in the Adriatic regions under general Saint-Cyr. In 1805 he was again in Naples with Murat and Joseph Bonaparte, to whom too he would become closely tied by friendship and personal fidelity.

In the years 1808 and 1809 Lechi was in Spain at the service of Joseph Bonaparte that has yielded away in the meantime the Kingdom of Naples to Murat; Joseph conquered the city of Barcelona and becomes temporarily the governor there.

In 1809 he faced a trial in France (apparently for claims of violence, embezzlement and abuse) but escaped the judgment and was sent back to Naples at the service of his friend, the new king, Joachim Murat.

Lechi was also involved in the conspiracies of general Domenico Pino, probably also as a link for Murat himself in the plot.

On 31 January 1814, Giuseppe was governor of Tuscany handing over Livorno to the English Fleet in an attempt made by Murat to bargain a separate peace with Austria. In 1815 "Joseph" Lechi was as always at Murat's side in his last and hopeless stand against the Austrians at the Battle of Tolentino (2–3 May 1815). As a prisoner of war, Lechi refused to swear any fidelity to the new Habsburgic regime and remained jailed in Lubiana till 1818.

Freed, Lechi settled down in his family's Villa of Montirone near Brescia and married Eleonora, daughter of Joseph Jérôme, Comte Siméon. He then died of cholera in 1836 in Montirone.

Notes

External links
 http://www.storiadimilano.it/Personaggi/Milanesi%20illustri/personaggi_avventurosi.htm
 Istituto Storico delle Insorgenze, L'insurrezione di Brescia
 Paolo Martinucci: "PREMESSE STORICHE E CULTURALI DELL’INSORGENZA NEL BERGAMASCO E NEL BRESCIANO", http://www.identitanazionale.it/inso_1002.php

1766 births
1836 deaths
18th-century Italian people
Deaths from cholera
Italian commanders of the Napoleonic Wars
Italian Freemasons
Italian generals
Italian military personnel of the Napoleonic Wars
People of the Kingdom of Naples (Napoleonic)